Liminka is a municipality in the Northern Ostrobothnia region in Finland.

The neighbouring municipalities are Kempele, Lumijoki, Muhos, Oulunsalo, Siikajoki, Siikalatva, Tyrnävä, Vaala and Ala-Temmes.

The Liminganlahti Bay is a notable bird sanctuary.

History
Liminka was founded in 1477.

According to folklore, the name Liminka comes from the fictional giant, Limmi.

Twinnings
 Nõo Parish, Estonia

References

External links

Municipality of Liminka – Official website 
Bay of Liminka

 
Populated places established in the 1470s
Populated coastal places in Finland